This is a list of all-time Grand Prix motorcycle racing (50cc/80cc, 125cc/Moto3, 250cc/Moto2, 350cc, 500cc/MotoGP, Formula 750, and MotoE classes) rider records, since 1949. Riders competing in the 2022 MotoGP, Moto2, Moto3, and MotoE season are highlighted in bold.

This page is accurate as of the 2022 Valencian Grand Prix.

Race entered and started
Riders are considered to be entered into a race if they attempt to compete in at least one official practice session with the intent of entering the race. These drivers are noted on the entry list for that race. A rider is considered to have started a race if they line up on the grid or at the pitlane exit for the start of the race. If a race is stopped and restarted, participation in any portion of the race is counted, but only if that portion was in any way counted towards the final classification.

Total entries

Total starts

Wins

Total Grand Prix wins

Most consecutive Grand Prix wins

Youngest Grand Prix winners
(only the first win for each rider is listed)

Oldest Grand Prix winners
(only the last win for each rider is listed)

Pole positions

Total pole positions

Most consecutive pole positions

Most seasons with a pole position

Podium finishes

Total podium finishes

Youngest to score a podium finish

Points
Throughout the history of the Grand Prix motorcycle racing World Championship, the points-scoring positions and the number of points awarded to each position have varied – see the List of FIM World Championship points scoring systems for details.

Total points

Most consecutive points finishes

Riders' Championships

Total championships

Most consecutive championships

Youngest World Riders' Championship winners
(at the time they clinched the first/only title)

Oldest World Riders' Championship winners
(at the time they clinched the last/only title)

References

External links
The Official MotoGP Website

Grand Prix motorcycle racing
Sports records and statistics
Grand Prix